Panchtarni is a locality in Anantnag district of the Indian union territory of Jammu and Kashmir. It is a popular pilgrimage and tourist destination on the way to Amarnath Temple near the Amarnath Glacier in Himalayas. It is also the final helicopter drop off for the Amarnath yatra pilgrims, who have to trek the rest of the  journey either on foot or by mule from this camp.

Climate
It has subtropical highland climate with the winters being long and cold winter while the summers are short and mild.

Amarnath Yatra

Panchtarni, a rest camp for the Amarnath yatra, is located between the base camp at Pahalgam and the last rest camp at Sheshnag Lake before the final Amarnath cave shrine. It begins with a  mountainous trek from the Nunwan and Chandanwari base camps at Pahalgam and reaches cave-shine after night halts at Sheshnag Lake and Panchtarni camps.

See also
Sonamarg
Sopore

References

External links

Anantnag district